Ștefan Marinel Vlădoiu (born 28 December 1998) is a Romanian professional footballer who plays as a defender for Liga I club CS Universitatea Craiova.

Honours
Universitatea Craiova
Cupa României: 2020–21
Supercupa României: 2021

References

External links
 
 

1998 births
Living people
People from Vâlcea County
Romanian footballers
Association football defenders
Liga I players
CS Universitatea Craiova players
FC Dunărea Călărași players
FC Universitatea Cluj players
Liga II players
CS Sportul Snagov players
Romania under-21 international footballers